Hoàng Lệ Quyên (born 19 October 1992) is a Vietnamese singer who became known from Vietnam Idol (season 4). The final was a competition between Hoàng Quyên and the best placed male singer, and ultimate winner, Ya Suy.

References

1992 births
21st-century Vietnamese women singers
Living people
Place of birth missing (living people)